Victoria Justice is an American singer and actress. Her music career started in 2011 when she contributed vocals to the soundtrack albums for the American TV sitcom, Victorious, in which she also starred from 2010 to 2013. Three soundtrack albums were released between 2011 and 2012.

Songs

Released

Unreleased

See also
Victoria Justice discography

References

Justice, Victoria